Edwin Willard Deming (1860–1942) was an artist in the US who depicted scenes of indigenous tribe members. He was a painter, illustrator, and sculptor. One of his murals was adapted for use on U.S. postage.

Deming traveled with fellow artist DeCost Smith in 1890.

Gallery

References

External links
 
 

1860 births
1942 deaths
19th-century American sculptors
20th-century American sculptors
19th-century American painters
20th-century American painters
American male painters
American male sculptors
American illustrators
19th-century American male artists
20th-century American male artists